Warp Speed or variation, may refer to:

 Warp speed, a speed of warp drives, especially fictional ones from Star Trek
 WarpSpeed, a 1992 videogame
 Operation Warp Speed, a 2020 U.S. federal government program, public-private partnership, to quickly develop COVID-19/SARS-CoV-2 vaccines

See also

 Warp Speed Chic, a 2018 short film by Arctic Monkeys
 Speed (disambiguation)
 Warp (disambiguation)